Haplomaro is a monotypic genus of Central African dwarf spiders containing the single species, Haplomaro denisi. It was first described by F. Miller in 1970, and has only been found in Angola.

See also
 List of Linyphiidae species (A–H)

References

Endemic fauna of Angola
Linyphiidae
Monotypic Araneomorphae genera
Spiders of Africa